Cyclostrema virginiae is a species of sea snail, a marine gastropod mollusk in the family Liotiidae.

Description
The height of the shell attains 6 mm.

Distribution
This species occurs in the Indian Ocean off Madagascar and Réunion; in the Pacific Ocean off Japan.

References

 Jousseaume, F., 1872. Etude des genres Teinostoma, Cyclostrema et Skenea. Revue et Magasin de Zoologie 23(2): 330-338; 388-396
 Dautzenberg, Ph. (1929). Contribution à l'étude de la faune de Madagascar: Mollusca marina testacea. Faune des colonies françaises, III(fasc. 4). Société d'Editions géographiques, maritimes et coloniales: Paris. 321–636, plates IV-VII pp.
 Higo, S., Callomon, P. & Goto, Y. (1999). Catalogue and bibliography of the marine shell-bearing Mollusca of Japan. Osaka. : Elle Scientific Publications. 749 pp.

External links
 

virginiae
Gastropods described in 1872